Krasnohrad or Krasnograd is a city in Kharkiv Oblast (province) of Ukraine. From 1784 to 1922, it was known as Kostyantynohrad or Konstantingrad. It serves as the administrative center of Krasnohrad Raion. Krasnohrad hosts the administration of Krasnohrad urban hromada, one of the hromadas of Ukraine. In 2022, the population was estimated to be

History 
The city of Krasnohrad was founded as a Bilevska fortress in 1731–1733, as part of the Ukrainian line defence fortifications, which ran from the Dnieper to the Donets. In 1784, the fortress was renamed Kostyantynohrad, and in 1797, it received city status. In 1922, it was renamed Krasnohrad.

It is located on the Berestova River  to the south of the city of Kharkiv.

Climate

References

Cities in Kharkiv Oblast
Konstantinogradsky Uyezd
Cities of district significance in Ukraine
Populated places established in 1731